This is a list of cricket grounds in New Zealand. The list includes all grounds that have been used for Test, One Day International, Twenty20 International, first-class, List A and Twenty20 cricket matches. The grounds that have hosted international cricket games are listed in bold.

List of cricket grounds

First used and last used refer to the season in which the ground hosted its first and last game. If only one game was played at the ground, only the first used date is given.

See also
List of Test cricket grounds - Full international list
List of stadiums in New Zealand
List of Australian rugby union stadiums by capacity
List of Australian rugby league stadiums by capacity
List of Australian association football stadiums by capacity

References

External links
Grounds in New Zealand - CricketArchive
New Zealand Cricket Grounds - ESPN Cricinfo
HowSTAT! Grounds List

New Zealand

New Zealand
Grounds
Cricket grounds